The Apollonian and the Dionysian are philosophical and literary concepts represented by a duality between the figures of Apollo and Dionysus from Greek mythology. Its popularization is widely attributed to the work The Birth of Tragedy by Friedrich Nietzsche, though the terms had already been in use prior to this, such as in the writings of poet Friedrich Hölderlin, historian Johann Joachim Winckelmann, and others. The word Dionysian occurs as early as 1608 in Edward Topsell's zoological treatise The History of Serpents. The concept has since been widely invoked and discussed within Western philosophy and literature.

In Greek mythology, Apollo and Dionysus are both sons of Zeus. Apollo, son of Leto, is the god of the sun, art, music, poetry, plague and disease, of rational thinking and order, and appeals to logic, prudence and purity and stands for reason.  Dionysus, son of Semele, is the god of wine, dance and pleasure, of irrationality and chaos, representing passion, emotions and instincts. The ancient Greeks did not consider the two gods to be opposites or rivals, although they were often entwined by nature.

Nietzschean usage

Later usages

Continental philosophy 
Nietzsche's idea has been interpreted as an expression of fragmented consciousness or existential instability by a variety of modern and post-modern writers, especially Martin Heidegger, Michel Foucault and Gilles Deleuze. According to Peter Sloterdijk, the Dionysian and the Apollonian form a dialectic; they are contrasting, but Nietzsche does not mean one to be valued more than the other. Truth being primordial pain, our existential being is determined by the Dionysian/Apollonian dialectic.

Extending the use of the Apollonian and Dionysian onto an argument on interaction between the mind and physical environment, Abraham Akkerman has pointed to masculine and feminine features of city form.

Ruth Benedict 
Anthropologist Ruth Benedict used the terms to characterize cultures that value restraint and modesty (Apollonian) and ostentatiousness and excess (Dionysian). An example of an Apollonian culture in Benedict's analysis was the Zuñi people as opposed to the Dionysian Kwakiutl people. The theme was developed by Benedict in her main work Patterns of Culture.

Albert Szent-Györgyi 
Albert Szent-Györgyi, who wrote that "a discovery must be, by definition, at variance with existing knowledge", divided scientists into two categories: the Apollonians and the Dionysians. He called scientific dissenters, who explored "the fringes of knowledge", Dionysians. He wrote, "In science the Apollonian tends to develop established lines to perfection, while the Dionysian rather relies on intuition and is more likely to open new, unexpected alleys for research...The future of mankind depends on the progress of science, and the progress of science depends on the support it can find. Support mostly takes the form of grants, and the present methods of distributing grants unduly favor the Apollonian".

Camille Paglia 
American humanities scholar Camille Paglia writes about the Apollonian and Dionysian in her 1990 bestseller Sexual Personae. The broad outline of her concept has roots in Nietzschean discourse, an admitted influence, although Paglia's ideas diverge significantly.

The Apollonian and Dionysian concepts comprise a dichotomy that serves as the basis of Paglia's theory of art and culture. For Paglia, the Apollonian is light and structured while the Dionysian is dark and chthonic (she prefers Chthonic to Dionysian throughout the book, arguing that the latter concept has become all but synonymous with hedonism and is inadequate for her purposes, declaring that "the Dionysian is no picnic"). The Chthonic is associated with females, wild/chaotic nature, and unconstrained sex/procreation. In contrast, the Apollonian is associated with males, clarity, celibacy and/or homosexuality, rationality/reason, and solidity, along with the goal of oriented progress: "Everything great in western civilization comes from struggle against our origins".

She argues that there is a biological basis to the Apollonian/Dionysian dichotomy, writing: "The quarrel between Apollo and Dionysus is the quarrel between the higher cortex and the older limbic and reptilian brains". Moreover, Paglia attributes all the progress of human civilization to masculinity revolting against the Chthonic forces of nature, and turning instead to the Apollonian trait of ordered creation. The Dionysian is a force of chaos and destruction, which is the overpowering and alluring chaotic state of wild nature. Rejection of – or combat with – Chthonianism by socially constructed Apollonian virtues accounts for the historical dominance of men (including asexual and homosexual men; and childless and/or lesbian-leaning women) in science, literature, arts, technology and politics. As an example, Paglia states: "The male orientation of classical Athens was inseparable from its genius. Athens became great not despite but because of its misogyny".

See also 
 "Cygnus X-1, Book II: Hemispheres", a song by Canadian rock band Rush based in part on the concept.
Logocentrism 
Phallogocentrism
 Light side and dark side of the force

References 

Ancient Greece studies
Apollo
Concepts in aesthetics
Concepts in epistemology
Conceptual distinctions
Continental philosophy
Dionysus
Existentialist concepts
Greek mythology studies
History of literature
Jungian archetypes
Literary concepts
Philosophy of Friedrich Nietzsche